French people may refer to:

 in terms of ethnicity: all ethnic French people, in and outside of France
 in territorial terms: people of France, entire population of France, historical or modern
 in modern legal terms: all people who poses the citizenship of France

Other uses 
 Rally of the French People, former political party in France
 French People's Party (1936), former political party in France
 French People's Youth (1941), former organization in France

See also 
 French (disambiguation)
 France (disambiguation)